Kalyani is a planned urban city in Nadia district in the Indian state of West Bengal. It is also a municipality and Community Development Block in Nadia. It is located around 50 kilometres (31 miles) from Kolkata — the capital of West Bengal. Kalyani is the administrative headquarters of Kalyani subdivision. It resides on the eastern banks of Hooghly River, and is part of the Kolkata Metropolitan Development Authority (KMDA).

During the period of World War II, the surroundings of the then Chandamari village was purportedly used as an air base by the United States Army Air Forces, and was known by the name of "Roosevelt Town" or "Roosevelt Nagar", after then US President Franklin D. Roosevelt. Later, after the surrender of Japan and the independence of India, the air base was abandoned. On the same area, a planned town named "Kalyani" was developed by the Government of West Bengal in 1951 on the behest of Bidhan Chandra Roy – the second Chief Minister of West Bengal – for hosting the Indian National Congress meeting and to accommodate the housing needs of the growing population of Calcutta. Kalyani, being a planned town, is characterized by underground sewage system, paved roads forming rectangular grids, tree-lined avenues and community parks. 

Kalyani has a dedicated industrial zone including Andrew Yule and Company, Kalyani Breweries (UB Group), Black Label beer and Dabur, TDK-EPCOS, though many of the industries have either closed or stopped production. It is an important centre of education in West Bengal, with two universities (University of Kalyani and Bidhan Chandra Krishi Viswavidyalaya), IISER, 
IIIT Kalyani, All India Institute of Medical Sciences, Kalyani, College of Medicine & JNM Hospital, Kalyani Government Engineering College and other institutes of higher education and research. Kalyani Stadium has emerged as an alternative location to Kolkata for holding numerous I-League football matches and other sporting events. The Bengal Cricket Academy and a stadium have been established by Cricket Association of Bengal in Kalyani for promotion and development of cricket.

History
Kalyani, located in Nadia district in the state of West Bengal, is a relatively young town. During the Second World War, Kalyani, was the site of an American military airbase, formed out of 45 villages in the district of Nadia.

The military garrison town was named after the then-sitting President of the United States Franklin D. Roosevelt as "Roosevelt Town" or "Roosevelt Nagar", with "nagar" meaning "town" in many Indo-Aryan languages, including Bengali. Hangars and other reminders of the airfield are still visible in the 'A' Block and some areas around Kalyani University, whose buildings were built on or over the runways. After World War II, the United States Army Air Force left the base, and the airfield and hangars went into disuse.

The development of modern Kalyani is credited to the former Chief Minister of West Bengal, Bidhan Chandra Roy. After the independence of India in 1947, the master plan of the town was developed and the foundation stone for the town was laid by the then Governor of West Bengal, Kailashnath Katju, on 24 February 1951. The town was built quickly in order to host the 59th Indian National Congress meeting in 1954. In memoriam of that conference, a road of the town was named as 'Congress Road'. In 1957, the Kalyani police station was formed, and in 1979, the rail line was extended from Kalyani Central to Kalyani Simanta station, and also established direct connectivity to Kolkata through Kalyani Simanta local EMU trains.

In 1995, Kalyani Municipality was established, which has been crucial in the development of infrastructure in Kalyani. In 2014, Kalyani was selected as a candidate for a "Smart City" project.

Geography and urban structure
Kalyani is located in the Nadia district of West Bengal, within the Kolkata metropolitan area. Kalyani lies along the east bank of the Hooghly River, within the upper Ganges Delta. As with most of the Indo-Gangetic Plain, the soil and water are predominantly alluvial in origin. Kalyani is located over the "Bengal basin", a pericratonic tertiary basin.

Kalyani is a planned city, having underground drainage systems, tree-lined avenues, community parks, paved roads intersecting each other at 90-degree angle. The city itself is divided into four blocks — Block A, Block B, Block C and Block D, which are further divided into sub-blocks. Block A and B are mostly residential in character with commercial markets. Main Post Office, Industrial Training Institute, Government offices and the Public Library along with offices of major Banks are situated in Block B. Whereas the Kalyani main station, State General Hospital, Medical college are situated in A Block. Block C and Block D are located to the north of Kalyani Simanta branch line. Block C is reserved for institutional use and is largely occupied by the Kalyani University and Kalyani Government Engineering College. Block D is the industrial zone, consisting of many small and medium-sized industries.

In June 2015, the Government of West Bengal declared establishment of an "Analytics City" name Samriddhi in Kalyani, besides Uditi Government Housing Project which was projected to attract investments of more than Rs 3,000 crore in next three years. In the first phase, being developed over 52 acres off Kalyani Expressway, the hub will accommodate academic, residential and commercial centers apart from real estate projects.

New Kalyani Block consists of 7 Gram Panchayats: Saguna, Madanpur - 1, Madanpur - 2, Chanduria - 2, Simurali, Kanchrapara, and Sarati.

Police station
Kalyani police station under Ranaghat Police District has jurisdiction over Kalyani, Gayespur municipal towns and Saguna Panchayat areas. The total area covered by the police station is 64 km2 and the population covered is 201,871 (2001 census).

Demographics
As of 2011 Census of India, Kalyani has a population of 100,620.  Males constitute 50.55% of the population and females 49%. Kalyani has an average literacy rate of 88.75%, higher than the national average of 69.5%: male literacy is 92.79%, and female literacy is 84.65%. In Kalyani, 7.55% of the population is under 6 years of age. The sex ratio of Kalyani is 978. As per 2001 Census, the average household size of Kalyani is approximately 4.61.  Percentage of main workers out of total population is 29%.

Civic administration and utility services
The town is within the Bongaon Lok Sabha Constituency and elects one member to the Lok Sabha (the Lower House of the Indian Parliament). The town area is covered by one assembly constituency, Kalyani that elects one member to the Vidhan Sabha, which is the West Bengal state legislative assembly. Kalyani town comes under the jurisdiction of the district police (which is a part of the state police); the Superintendent of Police oversees the town's security and matters pertaining to law and order. Kalyani is also the seat of the Subdivisional Court.

Kalyani quickly registered itself as a self-sufficient township. Its gradual development continued as a notified area. In 1995, it was upgraded to a municipality.

Transport
Kalyani railway station is on the Sealdah-Ranaghat Line of the Kolkata Suburban Railway. Apart from Kalyani main station, there are three different stations on the branch line which goes deeper into the Kalyani town — Kalyani Silpanchal, Kalyani Ghoshpara and Kalyani Simanta.

Kalyani is connected directly with Kolkata through Kalyani Expressway, which is currently being expanded to four-lanes. An extension of Kalyani Expressway connects the National Highway 2 near Bansberia through Iswar Gupta Setu. Rickshaws, E- rickshaw and Auto-rickshaws are used for local conveyance. Intra-city buses to important cities and towns in West Bengal, including Kolkata and Siliguri are operated by both Government and private operators.

Education
Kalyani's schools are run by the state government or private institution. Bengali and English are the primary languages of instruction. Schools in Kalyani follow the "10+2+3" plan. After completing their secondary education, students typically enroll in schools that have a higher secondary facility and are affiliated with the West Bengal Council of Higher Secondary Education, the ICSE, or the CBSE. They usually choose a focus on liberal arts, business, or science. Vocational programs are also available. Among the schools in Kalyani whose mode of instruction is English include Julien Day School, Jawahar Navodaya Vidyalaya, Springdale High School, Garden High School, IISER Kolkata Campus (in Mohanpur); while Kalyani University Experimental High School and Pannalal Institution instructs in Bengali.

Kalyani has two universities — University of Kalyani and Bidhan Chandra Krishi Viswavidyalaya (near Mohanpur), two central institutes of higher importance – Indian Institute of Information Technology, Kalyani, AIIMS Kalyani, three engineering colleges – Ideal Institute of Engineering, JIS College of Engineering and Kalyani Government Engineering College. There are 11 colleges out of which there are 2 universities and 3 research centers], one medical college – College of Medicine & JNM Hospital and other institutes of higher education and research, including National Institute of Biomedical Genomics, Eastern Regional Station of National Dairy Research Institute. Kalyani Mahavidyalaya – a general degree college under University of Kalyani and Snahanshu Kanta Acharya Institute of Law are among the other institutes of higher education.

The main campus of the Indian Institute of Science Education and Research, Kolkata (IISER-K) is located close to Kalyani, in Mohanpur. The main campus of BCKV, University college of West Bengal University of Technology is also located at Mohanpur near Kalyani. Clinical training of the students of West Bengal University of Animal and Fishery Sciences are imparted at Mohanpur campus.

Healthcare
Healthcare system in Kalyani consists of both government and private healthcare facilities. The Army hospital established during WWII by the American and British alliance was the first hospital in Kalyani. Later former Chief Minister of West Bengal Dr. B.C. Roy converted it into a hospital for tuberculosis patients in the 1960s, currently known as Netaji Subhash Sanatorium. Jawaharlal Nehru Memorial Hospital, a 500-bed hospital, is one of the major hospitals in the town. A medical college, College of Medicine & JNM Hospital, established in 2009, which acts as the University college of West Bengal University of Health Sciences. Gandhi Memorial Hospital has a dedicated cardiac surgery and cardiology department. ESI Hospital provides healthcare to workers under Employees' State Insurance MB Scheme. There is also a branch of National Institute of Homoeopathy with 25 acres herb garden which was established in 1975.

In June 2014, the central government gave in-principle clearance for setting up All India Institute of Medical Sciences, Kalyani at Basantapur village in the Saguna Panchayat in Kalyani. This project was shifted from earlier plans of setting up the AIIMS at Raiganj because of problems in land acquisition. The project will cost nearly Rupees 850 Crores.

Sports
Bengal Cricket Academy Ground, a cricket ground, hosts national level and club level cricket matches. It is also the home ground of Bengal cricket team. Kalyani Stadium hosts national level football matches. The Kolkata Giants Mohun Bagan, East Bengal FC and Mohammedan S.C. use Kalyani Stadium as their home ground in some national level matches. A swimming pool and well-equipped gymnasium are also attached with the Stadium.

Gallery

References

External links
 
 
 Kalyani Municipality Website

 
Planned cities in India
Kolkata Metropolitan Area
Neighbourhoods in Kolkata
Cities and towns in Nadia district
Community development blocks in Nadia district